The D.S. Chamberlain Building, also known as the L. W. Taylor Motor Company and Payne Motor Company Building, is a historic building located in Des Moines, Iowa, United States.  The two-story brick structure was designed by the prominent Des Moines architectural firm of Proudfoot, Bird & Rawson.  Completed in 1917, it features elongated Chicago-style windows on the upper floors and simple geometric details on the cornice level that reflect the Collegiate Gothic style.  The building was built as a speculative venture by Davis S. Chamberlain, who was one of the founders of his family's drug manufacturing company.  It is located in the city's "Motor Row" or "Auto Row" on the west side of downtown.  In 1916 there were 111 motor related firms in Des Moines that was valued at $12 million in annual trade.  Both the Taylor Motor Company and the Payne Motor Company were housed in the double storefront building for many years.  Other car dealerships followed.  The building was listed on the National Register of Historic Places in 2007.

References

Commercial buildings completed in 1917
National Register of Historic Places in Des Moines, Iowa
Commercial buildings on the National Register of Historic Places in Iowa
Buildings and structures in Des Moines, Iowa